Harut Grigorian (born 24 March 1989) is an Armenian-Belgian kickboxer and former Glory Welterweight Champion. He has also competed in the It's Showtime and K-1 promotions.

He was ranked in the Combat Press welterweight top ten between September 2017 and July 2021. He reentered the rankings at No. 9 in March 2022.

Career

Early career
Grigorian rose to prominence as a young fighter with an extensive record in his adopted country of Belgium. In perhaps the most notable bout of his early career, he featured as a reserve fighter at the S-Cup Europe 2008 in Gorinchem, Netherlands on 20 September 2008, where he defeated Abdallah Mabel by decision.

On 21 February 2009, he defeated Pedro Sedarous via decision after five rounds to claim the Benelux Muay Thai -70 kg Championship. He debuted in the It's Showtime organization later that year when he defeated Chris Ngimbi by an extra round decision at It's Showtime 2009 Lommel on September 24. He followed this up with a technical knockout win over Seo Doo Won at It's Showtime 2009 Barneveld on 21 November 2009.

2010
Grigorian competed in the eight-man grand prix at the K-1 World MAX 2010 West Europe Tournament held in Utrecht, Netherlands on 21 March 2010. He defeated Bruno Carvalho and Anthony Kane by decision in the quarter-finals and semi-finals, respectively, before losing via a second-round KO to Mohamed Khamal in the final. Following this, he went 2-0 throughout the rest of the year, with decision wins over Henri van Opstal and Alessandro Campagna.

2011
He began 2011 with a decision win over Henri van Opstal on 12 February 2011. Following a disqualification loss to Gino Bourne on 19 March 2011, he rebounded with a first-round KO of Lahcen Ait Oussakour on 9 April 2011, before being invited to take part in the eight-man grand prix at BFN Group & Music Hall presents: It's Showtime "Fast & Furious 70MAX", which was held in Brussels, Belgium on 24 September 2011. At the quarter-finals stage, he was drawn against veteran Dutch fighter Andy Souwer and was able to take him to an extra round, after which he lost a close split decision.

2012
He was scheduled to face Chahid Oulad El Hadj at It's Showtime 2012 in Leeuwarden on 28 January 2012, but El Hadj pulled out due to an injury and Grigorian was instead set up with a rematch against It's Showtime 70MAX Champion Chris Ngimbi in a non-title fight. He put in a spectacular performance against the Congolese Muay Thai fighter, picking him apart before forcing the referee to stop the fight due to a cut in round two.

On 21 September 2012, Grigorian won his first bout as a professional boxer when he took a unanimous decision over Hovhannes Kishmiryan in Antwerp.

2013
Next up for Grigorian was a match with Juanma Chacon at Enfusion Live: Barcelona in Barcelona, Spain on 9 March 2012.

2014
On 20 September 2014, Grigorian competed in the eight-man grand prix at the A1 World Combat Cup held in Eindhoven, Netherlands. He defeated Nicky Lopez and Tayfun Ozcan by decision in the quarter-finals and semi-finals, respectively, and defeated Nordin Ben Moh by a first-round knockout in the finals to win the tournament championship.

2017
Grigorian suffered a controversial knockout blow from Murthel Groenhart in their rematch at Glory 42 Paris. He inexplicably turned his head away from Groenhart after getting kneed on the face which seemed to have left him a little dazed, confused, and shocked. With his back turned to Groenhart, Groenhart took the opportunity to end the fight by delivering the knockout punch to Grigorian from behind, shocking the crowd and drawing anger from three fans who invaded the ring and punched Groenhart, hurting the fighter. There was chaos in the ring until trainers from both sides as well as officials broke up the brawl with Grigorian still lying dazed with a deep cut over his eye. Groenhart and Grigorian later seemingly made up. This led to speculation that a third grudge match between the two rivals is very possible.

At Glory 44: Chicago, Grigorian competed in the Glory Welterweight Contender Tournament, defeating both Karim Benmansour in the semi-finals and Antoine Pinto in the finals, and earned a shot at the welterweight title.

2018
Grigorian faced Murthel Groenhart for a third time at Glory 50: Chicago for the Glory Welterweight Championship. In the first round, Harut dropped Groenhart with punches and the referee stopped the fight soon after, making him the Glory Welterweight Champion.

2021 
He opened a kickboxing school in Deurne.

Personal life
Harut and his teammate Marat Grigorian are often mistaken to be brothers, however both have confirmed that they are good friends but not related.

Titles
Multi Fight Club
 2022 MFC Welterweight Champion
Glory
 2018 Glory Welterweight Champion
 2017 Glory Welterweight Contender Tournament Winner
A-1
 2014 A1 World Combat Cup Tournament Champion
K-1
 2010 K-1 World MAX West Europe Runner up
Benelux Muay Thai -70 kg Champion

Kickboxing record
 
|- style="background:#cfc;"
| 2023-01-23|| Win||align=left| Andrea Festa || Golden Fighting Championships	|| Antwerp, Belgium || Decision|| 3 || 3:00
|- style="background:#cfc;"
| 2022-03-05|| Win ||align=left| Anghel Cardoş || Multi Fight Championship 1 || Yerevan, Armenia || Decision || 3 || 3:00
|-
! style=background:white colspan=9 |
|-
|- style="background:#fbb;"
|  2020-02-29 || Loss || align="left" | Jamie Bates || Glory 75: Utrecht || Utrecht, Netherlands || Decision (Unanimous) ||3 || 3:00
|-  style="background:#fbb;"
| 2019-03-09 || Loss||align=left| Cédric Doumbé || Glory 64: Strasbourg  || Strasbourg, France || TKO (3 Knockdowns Rule) || 2 ||  2:59
|-
! style=background:white colspan=9 |
|-
|-  style="background:#cfc;"
| 2018-06-02 || Win ||align=left| Alim Nabiev || Glory 54: Birmingham|| Birmingham, England || Decision (Unanimous) || 5 || 3:00 
|-
! style=background:white colspan=9 |
|-
|-  style="background:#cfc;"
| 2018-02-17 || Win ||align=left| Murthel Groenhart || Glory 50: Chicago|| Chicago, United States || TKO (Referee stoppage) || 1 || 2:07 
|-
! style=background:white colspan=9 |
|-
|-  style="background:#cfc;"
| 2017-08-25 || Win ||align=left| Antoine Pinto || Glory 44: Chicago - Welterweight Contender Tournament, Final|| Chicago, United States || Decision (Unanimous) || 3 || 3:00 
|-
! style=background:white colspan=9 |
|-
|-  style="background:#cfc;"
| 2017-08-25 || Win ||align=left| Karim Benmansour || Glory 44: Chicago - Welterweight Contender Tournament, Semi Finals|| United States || Decision (Unanimous) || 3 || 3:00 
|-  style="background:#fbb;"
| 2017-06-10 || Loss ||align=left| Murthel Groenhart|| Glory 42: Paris || Paris, France || KO (Punch) || 2 ||
|-
|-  style="background:#cfc;"
| 2017-03-25 || Win ||align=left| Pavol Garaj || Glory 39: Brussels || Brussels, Belgium || Decision || 3 || 3:00
|-
|-  style="background:#cfc;"
| 2016-12-10 || Win ||align=left| Danijel Solaja || Glory 36: Oberhausen || Oberhausen, Germany || TKO (Punches) || 1 || 1:01
|-  style="background:#c5d2ea;"
| 2016-06-25 || NC ||align=left| Yoann Kongolo || Glory 31: Amsterdam - Welterweight Contender Tournament, Semi Finals || Amsterdam, Netherlands || NC ||3 || 3:00
|-  style="background:#cfc;"
| 2016-04-16 || Win ||align=left| Maximo Suarez || Glory 29: Copenhagen || Copenhagen, Denmark || TKO || 1 || 2:55
|-  style="background:#cfc;"
| 2016-03-12 || Win ||align=left| Mathieu Tavares || Top Action|| Belgium || TKO || 2 || 
|-
|-  style="background:#cfc;"
| 2015-11-28 || Win ||align=left| Vahid Roshani || A1 World Combat Cup 20 || Eindhoven, Netherlands || TKO || 3 || 
|-  style="background:#cfc;"
| 2015-10-10 || Win ||align=left| Hafid El Boustati || Enfusion Live 32 || Ghent, Belgium || TKO || 2 || 
|-  style="background:#cfc;"
| 2015-05-23 || Win ||align=left| Alexis Iordanidis || VFC 2 °Coskun promotions° || Antwerp, Belgium || TKO || 2 || 1:30
|-  style="background:#cfc;"
| 2015-03-14 || Win ||align=left| Marco Piqué || Enfusion Live 25 || Turnhout, Belgium || Decision || 3 || 3:00 
|-  style="background:#cfc;"
| 2014-11-22 ||Win ||align=left| Yakup Kaya || Fight Night Bree || Bree, Belgium || Decision|| 3 || 3:00
|-  style="background:#cfc;"
| 2014-09-20 ||Win ||align=left| Nordin Ben Moh || A1 World Combat Cup - Final 8, Final || Eindhoven, Netherlands || KO || 1 ||2:00 
|-
! style=background:white colspan=9 |
|-  style="background:#cfc;"
| 2014-09-20 ||Win ||align=left| Tayfun Ozcan || A1 World Combat Cup - Final 8, Semi Finals || Eindhoven, Netherlands || Decision|| 3|| 3:00
|-  style="background:#cfc;"
| 2014-09-20 ||Win ||align=left| Nicky Lopez || A1 World Combat Cup - Final 8, Quarter Finals || Eindhoven, Netherlands || Decision|| 3|| 3:00
|-  style="background:#fbb;"
| 2013-12-14 || Loss ||align=left| Mohamed Diaby || Victory, Semi Finals || Paris, France ||Decision ||3 || 3:00
|-  style="background:#cfc;"
| 2013-06-01 || Win ||align=left| Antone Mandela ||  || Beringen, Belgium || Decision || 3 ||3:00
|-  style="background:#cfc;"
| 2013-01-26 || Win ||align=left| Detchpew Voravutch ||  || Lommel, Belgium || TKO || 2 ||
|-  style="background:#fbb;"
| 2012-05-27|| Loss ||align=left| Murthel Groenhart || K-1 World MAX 2012 World Championship Tournament Final 16 || Madrid, Spain || KO (punches)|| 3 || 3:00
|-  style="background:#cfc;"
| 2012-02-11 || Win ||align=left| Francesco Tadiello || Sporthal De Zandbergen || Sint-Job-in-'t-Goor, Belgium || KO || 1 ||
|-  style="background:#cfc;"
| 2012-01-28 || Win ||align=left| Chris Ngimbi || It's Showtime 2012 in Leeuwarden || Leeuwarden, Netherlands || TKO (cut) || 2 || 1:22
|-  style="background:#fbb;"
| 2011-09-24|| Loss ||align=left| Andy Souwer || BFN Group & Music Hall presents: It's Showtime "Fast & Furious 70MAX", Quarter Finals || Brussels, Belgium || Extra round decision (split) || 4 || 3:00
|-  style="background:#cfc;"
| 2011-04-09 || Win ||align=left| Lahcen Ait Oussakour || Le Grande KO XI || Liège, Belgium || KO || 1 || 
|-  style="background:#fbb;"
| 2011-03-19 || Loss ||align=left| Gino Bourne || Fight Night Turnhout || Turnhout, Belgium || DQ || || 
|-  style="background:#cfc;"
| 2011-02-12 || Win ||align=left| Henri van Opstal || War of the Ring  || Amsterdam, Netherlands || Decision (unanimous) || 3 || 3:00
|-  style="background:#cfc;"
| 2010-12-04 || Win ||align=left| Alessandro Campagna || Janus Fight Night 2010 || Padua, Italy || Decision || 3 || 3:00
|-  style="background:#cfc;"
| 2010-09-10 || Win ||align=left| Edson Fortes || Ring Sensation Gala || Utrecht, Netherlands || Decision || 3 || 3:00
|-  style="background:#fbb;"
| 2010-03-21 || Loss ||align=left| Mohamed Khamal || K-1 World MAX 2010 West Europe Tournament, Final || Utrecht, Netherlands || KO (punch) || 2 || 
|-
! style=background:white colspan=9 |
|-  style="background:#cfc;"
| 2010-03-21 || Win ||align=left| Anthony Kane || K-1 World MAX 2010 West Europe Tournament, Semi Finals || Utrecht, Netherlands || Decision || 3 || 3:00
|-  style="background:#cfc;"
| 2010-03-21 || Win ||align=left| Bruno Carvalho || K-1 World MAX 2010 West Europe Tournament, Quarter Finals || Utrecht, Netherlands || Decision || 3 || 3:00
|-  style="background:#cfc;"
| 2009-11-21 || Win ||align=left| Seo Doo Won || It's Showtime 2009 Barneveld || Barneveld, Netherlands || TKO (referee stoppage) || 1 || 
|-  style="background:#cfc;"
| 2009-09-24 || Win ||align=left| Chris Ngimbi || It's Showtime 2009 Lommel || Lommel, Belgium || Extra round decision || 4 || 4:00
|-  style="background:#cfc;"
| 2009-04-11 || Win ||align=left| Farid Riffi || Almelo Fight for Delight || Almelo, Netherlands || TKO || || 
|-  style="background:#cfc;"
| 2009-03-14 || Win ||align=left| Viktor Sarezki || War of the Ring || Belgium || KO (punch to the body) || 1 || 
|-  style="background:#cfc;"
| 2009-02-21 || Win ||align=left| Pedro Sedarous || Turnhout Gala || Turnhout, Belgium || Decision || 5 || 3:00
|-
! style=background:white colspan=9 |
|-  style="background:#cfc;"
| 2009-01-31 || Win ||align=left| Dahou Naim || Tielrode Gala || Tielrode, Belgium || 2nd extra round decision || 5 || 3:00
|-  style="background:#cfc;"
| 2008-09-20 || Win ||align=left| Abdallah Mabel || S-Cup Europe 2008, Reserve Bout || Gorinchem, Netherlands || Decision || 3 || 3:00
|-  style="background:#cfc;"
| 2008-09-14 || Win ||align=left| Jordy Sloof || The Outland Rumble || Rotterdam, Netherlands || KO (Right cross) || 1 || 
|-  style="background:#cfc;"
| 2008-03-08 || Win ||align=left| Naraim Ruben || Lommel Gala || Lommel, Belgium || TKO (retirement) || 3 || 
|-  style="background:#cfc;"
| 2008-02-23 || Win ||align=left| Pierre Petit || St. Job Gala || St. Job, Belgium || KO (Right punch) || 2 || 
|-  style="background:#cfc;"
| 2008-01-26 || Win ||align=left| Yildiz Bullut || Tielrode Gala || Tielrode, Belgium || TKO || 2 || 
|-  style="background:#cfc;"
| 2007-11-28 || Win ||align=left| Ibrahim Benazza || Lint Gala || Lint, Belgium || Decision || 5 || 2:00
|-  style="background:#cfc;"
| 2007-10-27 || Win ||align=left| Anthony Kane || One Night in Bangkok || Antwerp, Belgium || Decision || 5 || 
|-
| colspan=9 | Legend:

Boxing record

|-  style="background:#cfc;"
| 2012-09-21 || Win ||align=left| Hovhannes Kishmiryan || || Antwerp, Belgium || Decision (unanimous) || 4 || 3:00 || 1-0-1
|-  style="background:#c5d2ea;"
| 2011-03-04 || Draw ||align=left| Ahmed El Ghoulbzouri || || Antwerp, Belgium || Majority draw || 4 || 3:00 || 0-0-1
|-
| colspan=9 | Legend:

References

External links
 Official Glory profile
 

1989 births
Living people
Armenian male boxers
Belgian male boxers
Light-middleweight boxers
Armenian male kickboxers
Belgian male kickboxers
Welterweight kickboxers
Middleweight kickboxers
Armenian Muay Thai practitioners
Belgian Muay Thai practitioners
Belgian people of Armenian descent
Armenian emigrants to Belgium
People from Aragatsotn Province
Sportspeople from Antwerp
Glory kickboxers